Thomas Matchett (May 3, 1826 – January 10, 1900) was an Ontario businessman and political figure. He represented Victoria South in the Legislative Assembly of Ontario as a Liberal member from 1867 to 1871.

Matchett, who owned a pharmacy in  Omemee, Ontario, was defeated by Samuel Casey Wood for the same seat in the 1871 election. He served as clerk for Victoria County from 1876 to 1900, replacing Wood in that post. In 1850, he had married Letitia Jane Hughes.

External links 

Mariposa, the Banner Township : a history of the Township of Mariposa, Victoria County, Ontario, RW Irwin (1984)
Victoria County Biographies

1826 births
1900 deaths
Ontario Liberal Party MPPs